HMS Start Bay (K604/F604) was a Bay-class anti-aircraft frigate of the British Royal Navy, named for Start Bay in Devon. In commission from 1945 to 1946 in the Mediterranean Fleet, she spent most of her career in the Reserve Fleet.

Construction
The ship was originally ordered from Harland and Wolff, Belfast, on 6 March 1943 as the  Loch Arklet. However the contract was then changed, and the ship was laid down to a revised design as a Bay-class anti-aircraft frigate on 8 February 1944, launched on 15 February 1945, and not completed until 6 September 1945, after the end of hostilities.

Service history
Start Bay was originally assigned to the British Pacific Fleet, but after the surrender of Japan in August this was changed and she was allocated for service in the 66th Escort Division in the Mediterranean Fleet. After trials, testing, and working-up at Tobermory she sailed for Malta in November 1945, to carry out patrol duties in western Mediterranean, with visits to Gibraltar and Catania. She also deployed as guardship at Trieste, and carried out patrols in eastern Mediterranean to intercept ships taking illegal Jewish immigrants to Palestine in mid-1946.

In September 1946 she joined the newly formed 5th Frigate Flotilla based in Malta, and continued her patrols in the Eastern Mediterranean. She returned to the UK in October, was decommissioned in November, and put into Reserve at Portsmouth. She was refitted at Southampton in 1948, and her pennant number was changed to F604 in May 1948.

The ship attended the Coronation Review at Spithead in 1953 as part of the Reserve Fleet. She then carried out visits to ports on the south coast of England and in Wales before returning to Portsmouth.

Decommissioning and disposal
Placed on the Disposal List in 1958, she was sold to the British Iron & Steel Corporation (BISCO) for breaking-up by J. Cashmore, and arrived in tow at the breaker's yard in Newport, Wales, on 22 July 1958.

References

Publications

 

1945 ships
Bay-class frigates
Ships built in Belfast
Ships built by Harland and Wolff